Luni, also spelt Loni, is a village in the Punjab province of Pakistan. It is located at 32°48'0N 74°40'0E with an altitude of 278 metres (915 feet).

References

Villages in Punjab, Pakistan